Estrées-Deniécourt is a commune in the Somme department in Hauts-de-France in northern France.

Geography
It has the remains of a Roman road, the Chaussée Brunehaut passing through the village.

History
It is one of many villages in the north of France bearing the name Estrées. The etymology of the name is from strata (cognate of English "street"), the word for the stone-layered Roman roads in the area (some of which turned into modern highways). Hence Estreti, village on the road which developed into Estrées.

It was the scene of heavy fighting during the Battle of the Somme. The probable (unmarked) burial site of Raynal Bolling, the first U.S. officer of high rank to fall in combat.

The Estrées-Deniécourt Military Cemetery, is located at the west end of the village and the German Cemetery is located on the way to the commune of Fay.

Population

Miscellaneous
The commune holds an annual brocante (flea-market) each June.

See also
Communes of the Somme department

References

Communes of Somme (department)